Zecchino d'Oro (meaning "Golden Sequin") is an annual international children's song competition established in 1959 by Niny Comolli. It is broadcast by Rai 1.

The first two contests were held in Milan. In 1961, the contest was taken up by the Antoniano Institute and moved to Bologna. In 2009, Cino Tortorella left Zecchino d'Oro.

In 1963, Mariele Ventre, a conductor and director of young performers, created the Piccolo Coro dell'Antoniano Children's Choir (called Piccolo Coro "Mariele Ventre" dell'Antoniano after her death in 1995, and directed by Sabrina Simoni).

From 1976, the contest took on an international perspective - each year seven songs performed by Italian contestants and seven by foreign contestants voted for by a children's jury. The winning song is rewarded with the Zecchino d'Oro award.

As has been regularly stated during the event, the winners of the Zecchino d'Oro and Zecchino d'Argento are the writers and composers of the songs, not the children who interpret them. This rule applies to all editions.

Young songwriters are Yumiko Ashikawa (芦川祐美子, 7, who also has sung her song), Miruna Codruța Oprea (13), Ioachim Octavian Petre (13), and Lara Polli (13).

Songs from English-speaking countries at Zecchino d'Oro

Australia
Il più dei canguri (1978)
In Australia c'è (1987)
La Rosella (1991)

Ireland
L'amico dei perché (2001)

United Kingdom
Big Jim (1976)
Mother's day (1990)
Il tesoro del re (1998)
La mia età (2009)
Choof the train (2016)

United States
Sono una talpa e vivo in un buco (1976)
San Francisco (1979)
A mosca cieca (1981)
A come Alfabeto (1987)
Le barche della bontà (1992)
Il cestino dei sogni (1994)
Sottosopra (1997)
Su e giù (2000)
Rockhopper hop (2003)
Il segreto del sorriso (2007)
Regalerò un sogno (2011)

See also 
 List of songs recorded by Zecchino d'Oro

External links

www.zecchinodoro.org 1959-2009
Raiuno Official Homepage - 48 ZdO
Antoniano Official Homepage - 49 ZdO
Raiuno Official Homepage - 49 ZdO
Antoniano Official Homepage - 50 ZdO
Raiuno Official Homepage - 50 ZdO
Antoniano Official Homepage - 51 ZdO
Raiuno Official Homepage - 51 ZdO
Zecchino d'Oro Memories

Music festivals in Italy
Children's music festivals
Children's arts organizations
Child-related organisations in Italy
1959 in Italian television
1959 in Italian music